The extended amygdala is a macrostructure in the brain that is involved in reward cognition and defined by connectivity and neurochemical staining. It includes the central medial amygdala, sublenticular substantia innominata, and the bed nucleus of the stria terminalis. The boundaries are indistinct in Nissl stained sections.

References

External links 
 More information at BrainInfo

Amygdala